The Ghassed  is a family of guided bombs and missiles developed by Iran.

Overview

The Ghassed was designed in accordance with the needs of the Iranian Air Force to strategic arsenals and bombs. Once Ghassed is deployed, Iranian fighter jets can destroy enemy targets by this high-precision bomb without coming into the range of enemy fire. The Ghassed is a powered air-to-surface missile designed for strikes at long range against various targets. It is a rocket-boosted version of the MK-84 bomb, with the rocket motor increasing the launch range and so giving the launch aircraft protection from whatever defenses may protect the target. Ghassed can be deployed by Iran's F-4 and F-5 fighter jets.

A TV/IR-guided bomb has either a conventional television video camera or an infrared camera (for night vision) mounted to its nose. In remote-operation mode, the controller relays information through radio signals to a human operator, who is usually on board the bomber plane. The remote operator relays commands to the control system to steer the bomb through the air—the bomb acts something like a remote-control plane. In this mode, the operator may launch the bomb without a specific target and sight, and then pick up the target from the video as the bomb gets closer to the ground.

Variants

References

Guided bombs
Guided missiles of Iran
Air-to-surface missiles of Iran